Mystery Case Files: The Malgrave Incident is a puzzle adventure video game developed by Big Fish Games and Sanzaru Games and published by Nintendo for the Wii video game console. It was released in North America in June 2011, and in Europe in September 2011.

Development
The game was announced on April 13, 2011 as Mystery Case Files: Dust to Dust, but due to some issues, Big Fish Games changed the title into The Malgrave Incident together with the release of two new screenshots. On early June 2011, Nintendo released a teaser video of the game and opened a website on Nintendo's website. On June 7, 2011, Mystery Case Files: The Malgrave Incident became a part of the Electronic Entertainment Expo 2011 (E3 2011) where the game was demonstrated in front of the public and released the official trailer of the game.

Reception
The game received "mixed or average" reviews, according to video game review aggregator Metacritic.

Colin Moriarty of IGN wrote that the game was only for a small niche of casual gamers and would not be satisfying to most players. He described its craftsmanship as "insanely low-resolution graphics" and had similar criticism for its soundtrack. Moriarty wrote that the adventure genre was dead and only those who specifically sought out the type of game would appreciate it.

References

External links
Official website

2011 video games
Adventure games
Big Fish Games games
Puzzle video games
Wii games
Wii-only games
Multiplayer and single-player video games
Hidden object games
Casual games
Video games developed in the United States
Nintendo games